Chic Choc ! was a Canadian French-language TV magazine for teenagers which aired on the Aboriginal Peoples Television Network (APTN) for three non-consecutive seasons (2007, 2009 and 2010), hosted by Aboriginal singer-composer-producer Christian Laveau and actress Mélanie Napartuk, and directed by Québec-born but Ontario-based TV produced/director Léa Pascal. The show shown the teenage life of young Aboriginal teenagers of Quebec, by going through interviews, testimonials and short biographies. In 2008, the show won a Prix Gémeaux for Multiculturalism, however, original producer Attraction Images (then called Cirrus Communications), who first created the show along with TV producer Léa Pascal (they formed Nikan Productions to manage the rights), lost interest to do a second season, causing the show to go on hiatus. But a year later, Christian Laveau, one of the two hosts, decided to self-produce the show through his Wendake, Quebec-based company, Andawa Productions, and thus, retrieved the rights from Attraction Images in order to do so. The now redesigned show returned on the-air in 2009 and was renewed a second year in 2010, this time with co-executive producer Joanne Couture. The show then ended permanently, but the show website (www.chicchoc.tv) remained active. After Chic Choc ended, Laveau remained active in television production through Andawa Productions and produced a TV documentary series named La Vie est Hockey (Life Is Hockey), still for APTN, which aired in 2013. Also in 2013, he recorded an album of original Aboriginal-language songs called Sondawka with the help of musician-producer Gilles Sioui.

External links
Information about Chic Choc 
Official website 
Show's Information from original producer Attraction Images
Information about Christian Laveau

Aboriginal Peoples Television Network original programming
2007 Canadian television series debuts
2010 Canadian television series endings
French-language television programming in Canada
First Nations television series